Io e Caterina (internationally released as Catherine and I) is a 1980 Italian comedy film  directed by Alberto Sordi.

For his performance, Alberto Sordi was awarded with a Globo d'oro for best actor.

Plot summary 
Enrico has a troubled relationship with his wife, a waitress and his lover. For this reason he decides to abandon all of them and to dedicate himself to peace. In fact he has been interested in a friend's robot waiter, and so Enrico decides to buy one for himself. The robot is called Catherine (Caterina) and serves Enrico to perfection for some time until she starts behaving strangely when Enrico brings other women to his apartment. It appears clear at the end that Caterina was in fact developing human feeling and that made the relationship with her master very complicated.

Cast 
 Alberto Sordi: Enrico Melotti
 Catherine Spaak: Claudia
 Edwige Fenech: Elisabetta
 Valeria Valeri: Marisa
 Rossano Brazzi: Arturo
 Susan Scheerer: Pamela
 : Susan

References

External links 
 

1980 comedy films
1980 films
Films directed by Alberto Sordi
Films scored by Piero Piccioni
Italian comedy films
1980s Italian-language films
1980s Italian films